Hubert Auer (born 19 December 1981) is an Austrian retired footballer and current goalkeeping coach.

References
Guardian Football
 

1981 births
Living people
Austrian footballers
Association football goalkeepers
SV Ried players
SV Grödig players
FC Lustenau players
FC Kärnten players
BSV Bad Bleiberg players